San Martín Base is a permanent, all year-round Argentine Antarctic base and scientific research station named after General José de San Martín, the Libertador of Argentina, Chile and Perú. It is located on Barry Island, Marguerite Bay, Antarctic Peninsula.

At the time of its foundation in 1951, it was the first human settlement south of the Antarctic Circle.  it is Argentina's westernmost permanent base.

 San Martín is one of 13 research bases in Antarctica operated by Argentina.

History
The increased Antarctic activity that Argentina developed since 1940, along with the longstanding national interest to exercise effective sovereignty over one of the most remote areas of Antarctica created the need for a scientific station located south of the Antarctic Circle.

In order to transport the personnel and materials to Marguerite Bay, where the new settlement was to be built, the Argentine Navy hired the Santa Micaela. Commanded by Overseas Captain Santiago Farrell, it was a cargo ship belonging to the Argentine shipping company Pérez Companc S. A. 
The Santa Micaela left the port of Buenos Aires on 12 February 1951, and on 8 March it anchored at Marguerite Bay. The last part of the trip it was escorted by the Argentine Navy tug ARA Sanavirón.

San Martín was inaugurated on 21 March 1951, in the presence of the Santa Micaela and ARA Sanavirón crews and the base personnel led by then Colonel Hernán Pujato.

Since then, the meteorological station within the base provides detailed weather records and develops forecasts indispensable for the navigation of the sea waters adjacent to the Antarctic Peninsula.

In March 1952 the ARA Bahía Aguirre anchored at Marguerite Bay bringing a relief crew through a Sikorsky S-51 helicopter transfer, the first of its kind performed by the Argentine Armed Forces in Antarctica.

On 30 June 1952 a fire, exacerbated by the ongoing blizzard, devoured the main house and two food stores, the power plant and the radio station. With rationed food and fuel, activities continued normally, carrying on with the explorations schedule as originally planned.
During the 1952–53 season, thick ice blocked the way of relief ships, which aggravated the situation for the twenty base inhabitants. On 26 March 1953 the Argentine Air Force Avro Lincoln nicknamed Cruz del Sur airdropped food and other priceless items.

Personnel at San Martín Base conducted several exploration expeditions to the northern and southern boundaries of the bay. They also crossed the Antarctic Peninsula mountain range, reaching the Mobiloil Inlet on the Weddell Sea.

In 1960 the base was closed; it was reactivated as permanent on 21 March 1976.

On 14 June 1962 an expedition led by then First Lieutenant Gustavo Adolfo Giró Tapper left Esperanza looking for a passage that would link the village with San Martín. Using snowcats and sleigh dogs they explored Duse Bay, Prince Gustav Channel, Cape Longing, Foca Nunataks, Ameghino Peninsula, Jason Island, Cape Robinson and Carreta Bay, where they had to leave the snow cats and continue with sleds to cross the cordillera. After reaching San Martín, they traveled back to Esperanza, where they arrived on 25 August. This feat is considered even now as the most important ever made in the area.

Historic site
Some unused installations of the base, a cross, a flagpole and a monolith erected in 1951, have been designated as Historic Site or Monument, following a proposal by Argentina to the Antarctic Treaty Consultative Meeting.

Description
Marguerite Bay opens on the west coast of the Antarctic Peninsula. Wide and deep, the bay is closed between Belgrano and Alexander I islands, and the Fallieres Coast, making its access very difficult for most of the year due to the thick ice-covered waters.

In this zone, rarely visited because of the difficulties and hazards for navigation, there are several groups of islands, islets, rocks and reefs that draw a network of channels and fjords, usually frozen. Some of the most important islands are the Pourquoi Pas, Herradura, Caballete and Millerand, all of them next to the Debenham archipelago, where San Martín was built.

The base has several dependencies and facilities, namely: main house; airstrip; heliport; infirmary; chapel; main and auxiliary power plants; vehicle fleet (a number of ski-doos, and a few snow tracks and ATVs) and park, laboratory, mechanical and carpentry workshops, and several deposits.
The all-year capable airstrip is located on nearby Uspallata Glacier; during winter the deeply frozen sea is also used to land light aircraft.
The  infirmary and basic operating suite is attended by a doctor and a nurse; it has one bed, x-ray and odontological facilities.

San Martín is responsible for the maintenance of several Argentine-built refuges in the area: 17 de Agosto, El Plumerillo, Paso de los Andes, Chacabuco, Yapeyú, Maipo and Nogal de Saldán.

Scientific activities
The LASAN laboratory (LAboratorio SAN Martín), managed by the Argentine Antarctic Institute, carries out active scientific research in the areas of geomagnetism, riometry, meteorology, ionospheric surveying through high altitude weather balloons, phytoplankton biology, satellite geodesy, glaciology, etc.

An ongoing bilateral agreement between Argentina and Germany has prompted cooperation on glacier movement observations.

Ona Refuge

Refuge Ona is an Argentine Antarctic refuge installed and operated by the government of the Tierra del Fuego Province.

The construction of the refuge was part of the scientific project, called Perito Moreno, carried out under an agreement signed between the Instituto Antártico Argentino and the University of Freiburg in Germany. The researchers carry out studies on the displacement of glaciers and the dynamics of the snow layers. The shelter has a capacity for four people, food for 30 days, fuel, gas and first aid kit.

Climate 
The San Martín base has a polar climate that is moderated by its coastline position, hence having a  mean for the mildest month.

See also
 Argentine Antarctica
 List of Antarctic research stations
 List of Antarctic field camps
 Crime in Antarctica

References
Notes

Citations

External links

 Fundaciòn Marambio – Base San Martín 
 Dirección Nacional del Antártico 

San Martin
Populated places established in 1951
Historic Sites and Monuments of Antarctica
1951 establishments in Antarctica